Milton Freight Station is a historic freight station located at Milton, Northumberland County, Pennsylvania.  It was built by the Philadelphia & Reading Railroad in 1883.  It is a one-story, brick building measuring 30 feet by 100 feet, with a 20 foot long platform at the southern end.  It sits on a stone foundation and has a gable roof. The building houses borough offices.

It was added to the National Register of Historic Places in 1977.  It is located in the Milton Historic District.

References

Railway stations in the United States opened in 1883
Railway freight houses on the National Register of Historic Places
Railway buildings and structures on the National Register of Historic Places in Pennsylvania
Buildings and structures in Northumberland County, Pennsylvania
National Register of Historic Places in Northumberland County, Pennsylvania
Individually listed contributing properties to historic districts on the National Register in Pennsylvania